Fort Albany Airport  is located adjacent to Fort Albany, Ontario, Canada.

Airlines and destinations

Air Creebec also offers fixed wing air ambulance transfers from the airport to other destinations in Ontario or Quebec.

References

Certified airports in Cochrane District